The World Group was the highest level of Fed Cup competition in 2012. Eight nations competed in a three-round knockout competition. Czech Republic was the defending champion, and they successfully defended their title by defeating first-time finalists Serbia in the final.

Participating teams

Draw

First round

Russia vs. Spain

Serbia vs. Belgium

Italy vs. Ukraine

Germany vs. Czech Republic

Semifinals

Russia vs. Serbia

Italy vs. Czech Republic

Final

Serbia vs. Czech Republic

References

See also
Fed Cup structure

World Group